Night Work is the fourth book in the Kate Martinelli series by Laurie R. King. It is preceded by With Child and followed by The Art of Detection.

References

External links 
 

2000 American novels
Kate Martinelli (novel series)
Fictional portrayals of the San Francisco Police Department